Clothing laws vary considerably around the world. In most countries, there are no laws which prescribe what clothing is required to be worn. However, the community standards of clothing are set indirectly by way of prosecution of those who wear something that is not socially approved. Those people who wear insufficient clothing can be prosecuted in many countries under various offences termed indecent exposure, public indecency, nudity or other descriptions. Generally, these offences do not themselves define what is and what is not acceptable clothing to constitute the offence, and leave it to a judge to determine in each case.

Most clothing laws concern which parts of the body must not be exposed to view; there are exceptions. Some countries have strict clothing laws, such as in some Islamic countries. Other countries are more tolerant of non-conventional attire and are relaxed about nudity.  Many countries have different laws and customs for men and women, what may be allowed or perceived often varies by gender.

Separate laws are usually in place to regulate obscenity, which includes certain depictions of people in various states of undress, and child pornography, which may include similar photographs of children.

In some countries, non-sexual toplessness or nudity is legal. However, private or public establishments can establish a dress code which requires visitors to wear prescribed clothing.

There are a variety of laws around the world which affect what people can and cannot wear. For example, some laws require a person in authority to wear the appropriate uniform. For example, a police officer on duty may be required to wear a uniform; and it can be illegal for the general public to wear a police officer's uniform. The same could apply to firefighters and other emergency personnel. In some countries, for example in Australia, the boy scouts uniform is also protected.

In most courts of law, lawyers and judges are required by law or custom to wear court dress, which may entail robes or traditional wigs.

In many countries, regulations require workers to wear protective clothing, such as safety helmets, shoes, vests, etc., as appropriate. The obligation is generally on employers to ensure that their workers wear the appropriate protective clothing. Similarly, health regulations may require those who handle food to wear hair covering, gloves and other clothing.

Governments can also influence standards of dress shown on television through its licensing powers.

In addition to nude beaches and similar exceptional locations, there are some public events in which nudity is tolerated more than usual, such as the naked bike rides held in several countries.

International laws and customs and culture
There are many specific circumstances where body parts have to be covered, often for safety or sanitary reasons.

Australia
In Australia, indecent exposure laws only refer to the genital area. However, many local councils impose their own rules, and have the power to ask topless people to leave an area. Additionally, women who go topless are sometimes slapped with more vague charges such as being a public nuisance, or offensive behaviour.

On public beaches, local bylaws are not heavily enforced, and women can often sunbathe topless without issues.

Breastfeeding in public is a legal right in Australia. Under the Sex Discrimination Act 1984, no business or service provider can discriminate against a breastfeeding woman.

Brazil
Ever since 1940, in the Title VI of the Penal Code, naming crimes against sexual dignity (until 2009 crimes against [social] conventions), the fourth chapter is dedicated to a crime named "public outrage [related] to modesty".

It is composed of two articles, Art. 233 "Obscene Act", "to practice an obscene act in a public place, or open or exposed to the public", punished with arrest of three months to one year or a fine; and Art. 234 "Obscene Written Piece or Object", to do, import, export, purchase or have in one's property, to ends of trade, distribution or public display, any written, drawn, painted, stamped or object piece of obscenity, punished with arrest of six months to one years or a fine.

It is often used against people who expose their nude bodies in public environments that were not warranted a license to cater to the demographic interested in such practice (the first such place was the Praia do Abricó in Rio de Janeiro, in 1994), even if no sexual action took place, and it may include, for example, a double standard for the chest area of women and men in which only women are penalized. Such a thing took place in the 2012 FEMEN protests in São Paulo.

Criticism
Pervasive points of criticism to the legislation have included:
 They do not attack anyone's sexual dignity, instead causing outrage at best, but generally just extreme discomfort or embarrassment, that can be easily avoided through not looking to such a scene.
 The Art. 234 is aside obsolete, unconstitutional, for the 1988 post-military dictatorship Constitution having in its Fifth Chapter: "[the people] are free to the expression of intellectual, artistic, scientific and communicative activity, independently of censorship and license", reason to which, instead of making it suffer penal restriction, gives any distribution of media the right to be fully exerted.
 The flourishing Internet culture of Brazil, where such clearly banned media is freely shared in a public place, as well as its pornographic industry and sex shops.

Exceptions
Brazil has about 35 spaces open or mostly open to the public where it is possible to freely practice nudism, its sole public spaces being 8 beaches. They are not criminalized when the clothes-free area is private and away from a view from the street, or through legislation when the beaches are officiated by a municipal decree, for example. It has hosted the meeting of the International Federation of Naturism in 2008, and there is a growing interest in the practice.

Canada

In Canada, s.173 of the Criminal Code  prohibits "indecent acts". There is no statutory definition in the Code of what constitutes an indecent act (other than that the exposure of the genitals for a sexual purpose to anyone under 16 years of age), so the decision of what state of undress is "indecent", and thereby unlawful, is left to judges to decide. Judges have held, for example, that nude sunbathing is not indecent. Also, streaking is similarly not regarded as indecent. Section 174 prohibits being "nude" in a public place or in public view without "a lawful excuse", but defines "nude" only as being "so clad as to offend against public decency or order". The courts have found that nude swimming is not offensive under this definition.

Toplessness is also not an indecent act under s.173. In 1991, Gwen Jacob was arrested for walking in a street in Guelph, Ontario, while topless. She was acquitted in 1996 by the Ontario Court of Appeal on the basis that the act of being topless is not in itself a sexual act or indecent. The case has been referred to in subsequent cases for the proposition that the mere act of public nudity is not sexual or indecent or an offence. Since then, the court ruling has been tested and upheld several times.

A Canadian legal advice web site observes, "Canada has a tangle of confusing and inconsistently-enforced nudity laws. ... The public nudity section is one of the few areas of the Criminal Code that requires the attorney general's consent to lay a charge, implying a certain grey area around what constitutes illegal nudity. According to the government's Public Prosecution Service, the attorney general's consent is needed for two reasons: to avoid the specific harm that could result from prosecuting an innocent person; and to avoid the general harm resulting from prosecuting a case that is not in the public interest.

Germany
Germany has a long history of allowing mixed sex public nudity in designated areas (e.g., beaches and parks). This was true before WWII, after WWII in both West and East Germany and currently. Some of these areas are where clothing is optional and some are where clothing is forbidden (i.e., mandatory nudity). In non-designated areas, appearing nude in public "counts as a minor breach of the law. Prosecutions can follow if another citizen is offended, but few ever are."

India
In India, British colonial acts such as "indecent exposure", "public indecency", and so on, that involve exposure of a specific body part (genitals, buttocks, anus, nipples on women), a specific intention or effect (being sexually suggestive, offending or annoying observers) are illegal.

People in India have the right to wear any dress they like. The Constitution of India gives their citizens the right to wear anything as per their comfort.

New Zealand

In New Zealand, there is no specific law prohibiting nudity in public places. If a person is nude and also exhibiting lewd and lascivious, or obscene behaviour, then they may fall foul of obscenity laws.

The Police Offences Act 1908 prescribed imprisonment with hard labor for anyone who "willfully and obscenely exposes his person in any public place or within the view thereof". Male offenders could, at the court's discretion, also be sentenced to be whipped. This was replaced in 1981 by the Summary Offences Act, which abolished the hard labor and whipping and changed the offence to consist of the intentional and obscene exposure of the "genitals" rather than the "person". As well as excusing exposure of the buttocks or female breast from the offence, the change implies – since the words "genitals" and "obscenely" are both specified – that neither one can be automatically taken to imply the other. Public nudity is generally prosecuted under the offensive behaviour or disorderly conduct provisions instead.

The High Court of New Zealand has upheld a conviction of disorderly conduct for nudity in the street, because it was not a place where nudity was known to occur or commonplace. Being nude in the street is likely to incur a small fine if a complaint is made against the person, or if the person ignores a police order to cover themselves. However in practice, the likelihood of being prosecuted for nudity on a public beach is low, and in the past authorities have declined to prosecute topless and nude people on beaches.

In 1991, a High Court judge quashed a conviction of offensive behaviour for nudity on a beach in the presence of children, on the grounds that, since the beach in question was "a place where it was not uncommon for persons to sunbathe in the nude", a reasonable person would "regard the conduct... as inappropriate, unnecessary, and in bad taste, but not arousing feelings of anger, disgust, or outrage." New Zealand is a common law country, which means that judicial decisions determine the law that subsequent cases must follow.

Qatar
In Qatar, the penal code punishes and forbids the wearing of revealing or indecent clothes, this dressing-code law is enforced by a government body called "Al-Adheed". In 2012, a Qatari NGO organized a campaign of "public decency" after they deemed the government to be too lax in monitoring the wearing of revealing clothes; defining the latter as "not covering shoulders and knees, tight or transparent clothes". The campaign targets foreigners who constitute the majority of Qatar's population.

Singapore
In Singapore, public nudity and nudity in private premises exposed to public view are illegal under section 27A of the Miscellaneous Offences (Public Order and Nuisance) Act.

South Africa
In South Africa specific clothing laws exist for the general public. Nudity is treated under indecent exposure. On 3 April 2015 the country's first official clothing optional beach, Mpenjati Beach near Trafalgar in KwaZulu-Natal, opened after the Hibiscus Coast Local Municipality approved the South African Nudist Association's (SANNA) application. Although nudity has gradually been tolerated on Sandy Bay in Cape Town after the National Party (NP) lost the election in 1994, and strict enforcement of its moral values is no longer applied, it is not an official legally recognised public nude beach. Partial nudity is also tolerated on other beaches.

United Arab Emirates
Since 2008, the municipality of Dubai in the United Arab Emirates has ensured that signs are posted on beaches warning women against topless bathing and indecent exposure contrary to the cultural values of the UAE. There is no fine for breaking this rule, however a warning is issued and if necessary, ejection from the beach. This was said to be in response to residents' complaints about tourists sunbathing topless or nude and changing their clothes in public.

There are also signs at malls and shopping centers that advocates modest clothing which indicates that shoulders and knees must be covered, and public nudity is against the law. Violation of the law lead to a warning to cease and desist at first and would be followed with arrest if the person chooses to disobey the law.

United Kingdom
There are three legal jurisdictions in the United Kingdom (England and Wales, Scotland, and Northern Ireland). There are a further three jurisdictions that are Crown dependencies (Isle of Man, Bailiwick of Guernsey and Bailiwick of Jersey). The details of the law regarding public nudity differ substantially between them. In general nudity is not an explicit offence but there are various offences that may apply to nudity in unsuitable circumstances. What constitutes unsuitable circumstances varies according to the jurisdiction but nudity is legal in a much wider range of circumstances than many people assume.

The Crown Prosecution Service has published guidance for England and Wales; as have the College of Policing.

British Naturism has published guidance for England and Wales, and Scotland. They are preparing guidance for Northern Ireland.

In England and Wales the two statutes most likely to be applicable are s.5 Public Order Act 1986, and for aggressive nudity s.66 Sexual Offences Act 2003.

Stephen Gough, popularly known as the Naked Rambler, has been repeatedly prosecuted for public nudity in the UK.

United States

In the United States there are variety of different offenses, such as "indecent exposure", "public lewdness", "public indecency", "disorderly conduct" and so on, which may involve exposure of a specific body part (genitals, buttocks, anus, nipples on women), or a specific intention or effect (being sexually suggestive, offending or annoying observers).  In some cases, a member of the opposite sex must be present.  In Florida, designated nudity areas are given an explicit exception.  There are also some specific prohibitions against sexual acts, such as having sexual intercourse in public, or publicly caressing someone in a sexual way.  In Indiana and Tennessee, there are specific prohibitions against showing a noticeably erect penis through clothing, or other sensitive areas through semi-transparent clothing.  In some states, indecent conduct can also occur on private property, depending on the intent or effect of the act.  In some cases there are exceptions for spouses, breastfeeding, and in New York, theatre performances. In most states, there is a governing state statute which defines the offense; in Maryland and Massachusetts, indecency is defined by case law.  Some local (county and municipal) governments also regulate personal exposure, as well as commercial activities such as strip clubs.

Case law in general governs the interpretation of the statutory definition, and in some cases allows for additional exceptions.

In general, exposure of the head, upper chest, and limbs is legal, and considered socially acceptable except among certain religious communities.

Federal, state, and local regulations for certain occupations require various pieces of protective clothing for the safety of the wearer.  Such items include hard hats, safety vests, life jackets, aprons, hairnets, and steel-toe boots.

In the first decade of the twenty-first century, there was some controversy in some southern U.S. states over the wearing of  trousers so low as to expose the underwear (sagging). The practice was banned in some places.

Some states and towns have loose, or no, regulations for requiring clothing. The city of San Francisco has a history of public nudity, including at public events such as Bay to Breakers. The town of Brattleboro, Vermont, experienced a brief period during which there was public nudity, until a law was passed banning it.

Summary of various countries

See also

 Beard and haircut laws by country
Beard tax
 Committee for the Promotion of Virtue and the Prevention of Vice (Saudi Arabia)
 Emo killings in Iraq
 Hijab and burka controversies in Europe
 Hijab by country
 Issues in social nudity
 Jewish hat
 Let's trim our hair in accordance with the socialist lifestyle (North Korea)
 List of places where social nudity is practised
 Muslim patrol incidents in London
 Naturism
 Nude recreation
 Nudity and protest
 Nudity and sexuality
 Nudity
 Right to clothing
 Sumptuary law
 Timeline of social nudity
 Topfreedom
 Trousers#Laws
 Zunnar
 World Naked Bike Ride

References

Clothing by country
Clothing controversies
Nudity
Naturism
Clothing
Modesty
Dress codes